Feeble Little Horse (stylized as feeble little horse) is an American indie rock band from Pittsburgh, Pennsylvania. The band is currently signed to Saddle Creek Records.

History
Guitarists Sebastian Kinsler and Ryan Walchonski met in college and briefly took part in a garage rock band together. After leaving the band, they started working on a new project, which they called feeble little horse.  The duo enlisted the help of drummer Jake Kelley to release a debut project. feeble little horse's first EP, Modern Tourism, was released in May 2021. The band expanded to include singer and bassist Lydia Slocum, and feeble little horse released their debut full-length album, Hayday, through Philadelphia label Julia's War Recordings in October 2021. The group signed to Saddle Creek Records in October 2022, and re-released Hayday both through the label and their Unstable Collective imprint, adding both a bonus track, "Dog Song 2," and a remix of Hayday track "Termites" by the Philadelphia-based shoegaze band Full Body 2. The album's second single "Chores" received praise from the New York Times and Pitchfork.

On February 27, 2023, feeble little horse announced their second album with Saddle Creek, Girl with Fish, and issued the album's first single, "Tin Man." The album is set to be released on June 9, 2023.

References

Rock music groups from Pennsylvania
Musical groups from Pittsburgh
Saddle Creek Records artists